Monococcus is a monotypic genus of flowering plants belonging to the family Petiveriaceae. The only species is Monococcus echinophorus.

Its native range is Eastern Australia to Southwestern Pacific.

References

Petiveriaceae
Monotypic Caryophyllales genera